A by-election for the seat of Uralla-Walcha in the New South Wales Legislative Assembly was held on 27 October 1900 because of the death of William Piddington.

Dates

Result

William Piddington died.

See also
Electoral results for the district of Uralla-Walcha
List of New South Wales state by-elections

Notes

References

1900 elections in Australia
New South Wales state by-elections
1900s in New South Wales